Van Lam Hai or Lâm Hải Vân (born 29 January 1975) is a former Vietnamese sprinter who competed in the men's 100m competition at the 1996 Summer Olympics. He recorded an 11.14, not enough to qualify for the next round past the heats. His personal best is 11.04, set in 1993.

References

1975 births
Living people
Vietnamese male sprinters
Athletes (track and field) at the 1996 Summer Olympics
Olympic athletes of Vietnam